The Skeneidae are a speciose family of minute to small marine gastropod molluscs in the superfamily Trochoidea.

The former subfamily Skeneinae (in the family Turbinidae) was loosely defined. Information on the specific characters of this family are incompletely described. Recent molecular evidence suggests that a number of these genera in Skeneinae probably belong to other families altogether, so many of these assignments must be regarded as provisional. Williams noted in 2012 that "this group is in a desperate need of revision".
 The subfamily Skeneidae has been upgraded to the status of family Skeneidae, comprising most genera formerly in the subfamily Skeneinae. But even then, the family Skeneidae represents a polyphyletic, “skeneimorph” assemblage. It should be pruned of many genera which would go to the superfamily Seguenzioidea according to Kano (2008) 
Until a researcher formally assigns them to a seguenzioid family in the literature, the database WoRMS prefers to keep them unchanged.

This family is assemblage of small to very small shells that lack a nacreous structure. The shells are white and show no color patterns.

Genera

 Bruceiella Warén & Bouchet, 1993
 Callodix Laseron, 1954
 Callomphala A. Adams & Angas, 1864
 Cirsonella Angas, 1877 - synonym: Tharsiella Bush, 1897
 Dasyskenea Fasulo & Cretella, 2003
 Didianema Woodring, 1928
 Dikoleps Hoisaeter, 1968
 Dillwynella Dall, 1889
 Fucaria Warén & Bouchet, 1993
 Ganesa Jeffreys, 1883
 Haplocochlias Carpenter, 1864
 Iheyaspira Okutani, Sasaki & Tsuchida, 2000
 Leucorhynchia Crosse, 1867
 Liocarinia Laseron, 1954
 Liotella Iredale, 1915
 Lissomphalia Warén, 1992
 Lissospira Bush, 1897
 Lodderena Iredale, 1924
 Lodderia Tate, 1899
 Lopheliella Hoffman, van Heugten & Lavaleye, 2008
 Lophocochlias Pilsbry, 1921
 Mikro Warén, 1996
 Munditiella Kuroda & Habe, 1954
 Parisanda Laseron, 1954
 Partubiola Iredale, 1936
 Parviturbo Pilsbry & McGinty, 1945
 Philorene Oliver, 1915
 Pondorbis Bartsch, 1915
Protolira Warén & Bouchet, 1993
 Pseudoliotina Cossmann, 1925 
Pseudorbis Monterosato, 1884
 Rotostoma Laseron, 1954
 Seamountiella Rubio, Gofas & Rolán, 2019
 Skenea Fleming, 1825 - type genus
 Skeneoides Warén, 1992
 † Spinobrookula Lozouet & Maestrati, 1982 
 Tasmocrossea Dell, 1952
 Tholostoma Laseron, 1958
 Zalipais Iredale, 1915

Genera moved to other families
 Bathyxylophila B. A. Marshall, 1988: moved to family Larocheidae Finlay, 1927
 Conradia A. Adams, 1860: moved to the family Crosseolidae Hickman, 2013 
 Crossea A. Adams, 1865: moved to the family Crosseolidae Hickman, 2013
 Crosseola Iredale, 1924: moved to the family Crosseolidae Hickman, 2013
 Genera brought into synonymy
 Chunula Thiele, 1925: synonym of Granigyra Dall, 1889
 Crosseia P. Fischer, 1885: synonym of Crossea A. Adams, 1865
 Gottoina A. Adams, 1863: synonym of Conradia A. Adams, 1860
 Helisalia Laseron, 1954: synonym of Omalogyra Jeffreys, 1859
 Lapidicola Egorova, 1972: synonym of Lissotesta Iredale, 1915
 Porcupinia Cossmann, 1900: synonym of Cirsonella Angas, 1877
 Skeneia [sic]: synonym of Skenea Fleming, 1825
 Tharsiella Bush, 1897: synonym of Cirsonella Angas, 1877
 Tharsis Jeffreys, 1883:synonym of Cirsonella Angas, 1877

References

 Hickman, C.S. & McLean, J.H. (1990) Systematic revision and suprageneric classification of trochacean gastropods.; Natural History Museum of Los Angeles County Science Series, 35, 1–169
 Warén, A. (1991) New and little known skeneimorph gastropods from the Mediterranean Sea and the adjacent Atlantic Ocean. Bollettino Malacologico, 27, 149–248.

External links
 Seashells of New South Wales: Family Skeneidae

 
Trochoidea (superfamily)